Polygrammodes oxydalis is a moth in the family Crambidae. It was described by Achille Guenée in 1854. It is found in the southern United States, where it has been recorded from Georgia, Florida and southern Texas. It has also been reported from Costa Rica.

Adults have been recorded on wing from May to October.

The larvae feed on the roots of Vernonia species.

References

Spilomelinae
Moths described in 1854
Moths of North America